John Clarke (1732–1781) was the Provost of Oriel College, Oxford and an Anglican clergyman.

Education
Born in 1732 he was educated at John Roysse's Free School in Abingdon, (now Abingdon School) 1742 -1749.

He was a B.D. and Doctor of Divinity 19 May 1768.

Career
John Clarke was Provost of Oriel from 12 February 1768 until his death on 21 November 1781.

He was rector of Kingsdown near Wrotham from 1776-1781  and a Prebendary of Rochester.

See also
 List of Old Abingdonians
 List of Oriel College, Oxford people
 List of Provosts of Oriel College, Oxford

References

1781 deaths
People educated at Abingdon School
Provosts of Oriel College, Oxford
1732 births